"Travelin' Band" is a song written by John Fogerty and originally recorded by Creedence Clearwater Revival. It was included on their 1970 album Cosmo's Factory. Backed with "Who'll Stop the Rain", it was one of three double sided singles from that album to reach the top five on the U.S. Pop Singles Chart and the first of two to reach the number 2 spot on the American charts, alongside "Lookin' Out My Back Door", in which they were unable to interrupt the six-week run of the successful number one, "Bridge Over Troubled Water" by Simon and Garfunkel. "Travelin' Band" was also a hit in the UK, reaching number eight on the UK Singles Chart.

Background
The song was inspired, both musically and for Fogerty's vocal delivery, by 1950s rock 'n' roll songs, particularly those of Little Richard. Musically, it has also been described as nearly identical to The Monkees' 1967 song, "No Time". In October 1972, the company that held the publishing rights to Richard's "Good Golly, Miss Molly" felt that "Travelin' Band" bore enough similarities to warrant a plagiarism lawsuit that was later settled out of court. The lyrics of the song describe what life is like for a musician on the road. The opening line "Seven-thirty-seven coming out of the sky" refers to the Boeing 737, then coming into service on short-to-medium range routes.

Cover versions
It has been covered by a few artists, most notably Elton John, who recorded a cover of the song early in his career, and Bruce Springsteen, who has incorporated it into his "Detroit Medley" during live shows on numerous occasions. Jerry Lee Lewis sang the song with Fogerty on the album Last Man Standing.

It has been covered by Def Leppard and Brian May of Queen. The cover was ended with "Rock and Roll" by Led Zeppelin. The cover appears on the deluxe edition of Def Leppard's Pyromania.

On April 18, 2010, Miranda Lambert, Carrie Underwood, Brad Paisley, Charlie Daniels, and Fogerty performed the song as the opening to the 2010 Academy of Country Music Awards.

In popular culture

A cover of "Travelin' Band" by Curtis Stigers and The Forest Rangers is played during a chase scene in season 3 episode 7 of the television show Sons of Anarchy.

The Jeff Healey Band performs a cover of the song (as the house band at the Double Deuce) in the 1989 film Road House.

The song appeared in the Brazilian film O Homem Que Copiava in relation to an over-the-hill rock fan who has a preference for Creedence. It plays during the armored car robbery sequence.

The full version of "Travelin' Band" is played during the fight scene of the third episode of the television show The Good Guys.

The song is available as a playable song for the Rock Band series of music video games as downloadable content.

Following the terrorist attacks on September 11, 2001, the song was placed on the list of post-9/11 inappropriate titles distributed by Clear Channel.

Charts

References

1970 songs
1970 singles
Creedence Clearwater Revival songs
Songs written by John Fogerty
Song recordings produced by John Fogerty
Fantasy Records singles